The Digital Command Center was a very large remote control introduced for RCA's high-end television sets; in 1983 for the  Colortrak 2000 and the SJT400 CED player and in 1984 for the Dimensia Lyceum TV sets. The main feature of the Digital Command Center was that it was universal amongst many RCA components, including VCRs, CED players, tuners, amplifiers, CD players, etc., on top of controlling the monitor itself. The Digital Command Center took four AA batteries to power, due to its extensive and ahead-of-its time functionality. 

The initial Digital Command Center released in 1984 with the Dimensia system, the CRK35A, had 52 buttons, had onboard memory, and weighed nearly a pound with its batteries.

In 1985, RCA released the Digital Command Component System, an all audio system that was compatible with all Dimensia audio components, which also used the Digital Command Center remote. The idea of this system was to have the full functionality of the Dimensia's sound system without the need of a Dimensia monitor.

Dimensia Intelligent Audio Video and Dimensia Digital Control

In Dimensia television systems, the remote was called Dimensia Intelligent Audio Video or Dimensia Digital Control because all of the components were integrated so that the remote could activate the entire system with the touch of one button by communicating with the built-in computer found in the Dimensia monitor via the black control jack found on all Dimensia components. This remote had 8 device keys on it; TV, VCR, VID2 (DISC), AUX, AM/FM, PHON, TAPE, and CD. Since the CED Player intended to be released with the Dimensia system in 1984 was cancelled, the VID2 button and the ability to control the CED Players was absent from later remotes. 

In 1987, the Dimensia Intelligent Audio Video was replaced with a wedge-shaped remote (CRK45A) shown at the bottom of the picture above.

References

RCA Dimensia CRK35A Infrared Remote Control

External links
RCA Dimensia Channel on YouTube
RCA Dimensia Facebook page

Remote control
RCA brands
Television technology